Gayatri is a 2018 Telugu language action drama film written and directed by Madan and written by Diamond Ratna Babu. Produced by Mohan Babu, the film stars himself in a dual role, along with Shriya Saran, Nikhila Vimal, and Anasuya Bharadwaj. Mohan Babu's son Vishnu Manchu plays the younger version of one of his characters. The film also features Brahmanandam, Ali, Kota Srinivasa Rao, Tanikella Bharani, and Posani Krishna Murali in supporting roles. The film is the remake of Bangladeshi movie Aynabaji directed by Amitabh Reza Chowdhury. The music was composed by S. Thaman with cinematography by Sarvesh Murari. The film released on 9 February 2018.

This film is a tribute to director Dasari Narayana Rao, who died on 30 May 2017.

Plot
 
Dasari Sivaji, a stage artist by profession, runs an organization called Sarada Sadan to help destitute children. One day, he rescues a girl named Gayatri  from goons. Sivaji later gets a call from Gayatri, and he finds that her phone screen is his late wife Shaarada. He realizes that Gayatri is his long-lost daughter. Sivaji comes to Gayatri's college graduation, where she says that she does not know what her father looks but knows he is a heartless brute as he sold her for 1,000 rupees in order to buy alcohol. Sivaji is distraught and walks away to a temple. Gayatri is later told by Sivaji's friend Prasad that Sivaji is her father. Prasad hands Sivaji's diary to Gayatri, and she learns about Sivaji's past.

Young Sivaji was an orphan who found his calling in acting. He falls in love with Shaarada and marries her. However, one day, Shaarada becomes hospitalized. The doctor tells Sivaji that she is suffering from pelvic cancer and he needs a large amount of money to finance her treatment. Giri, Sivaji's friend, tells him that a man was refused bail and that if Sivaji goes to jail for two days, the amount will be paid. However, he ends up saying in jail for two weeks. When Sivaji confronts Giri, the latter confesses to him that Shaarada and her daughter, whom she was pregnant with, died. Sivaji gets upset and tries to kill himself by being hit by a train. Giri saves him but is killed while doing so. Before Giri dies, he reveals that the baby was alive and that he thought of selling the baby for a bottle of liquor. The baby, Gayatri, grew up in Ramanujam Orphanage. On her birthday, she is gifted a photo of her mother Shaarada, who died as soon as she delivered her.

The film returns to the present; Gayatri and Prasad go to Sivaji's house to try to find him, but to no avail. Sivaji is still at the temple, but he gets hit on the head and captured by goons. Gayatri and Prasad go to the temple but do not find Sivaji. The goons who captured Sivaji are the henchmen of his lookalike, Gayatri Patel. Sivaji later meets Gayatri Patel in person. Soon after, Gayatri Patel is arrested and sentenced to death for burning down a hospital, but Sivaji gets implicated in the case. Sivaji confesses to a police officer that he is Sivaji and not Gayatri Patel, but the police officer knew he was Sivaji. Gayatri Patel calls Sivaji and tells him that the former's death sentence was because a girl was a witness to the crime, and that girl was none other than Gayatri. Gayatri Patel now wants to kill Sivaji.

Gayatri Patel (as Sivaji) goes to Gayatri's house, where Gayatri apologizes to "him" for misunderstanding him. While Sivaji (as Gayatri Patel) is in jail, news reporter Shreshta Jayaram tells him that Gayatri Patel has gone to his house disguised as him and that Gayatri Patel has killed Prasad. At Gayatri's house, Shreshta later interviews her and Gayatri Patel (as Sivaji). While interviewing Gayatri Patel, Shreshta secretly tells Gayatri that her "father" is Gayatri Patel and not Sivaji. However, Gayatri accuses Shreshta of calling her "father" an impostor. Meanwhile, Sivaji (as Gayatri Patel) is sentenced to death. In jail, Sivaji tells Shreshta that his last wish is to watch Sivaji's acting. Many people want Sivaji (Gayatri Patel) to fulfill Gayatri Patel's (Sivaji) wish. However, Gayatri Patel wants to replace Sivaji and asks his lawyer to book his flight to the US. As Gayatri Patel and Gayatri are in the car, the news reports say that Sivaji is ignoring Gayatri Patel's plea. Gayatri Patel is then questioned by numerous people, and Gayatri begs Gayatri Patel to do the wish. Gayatri Patel does so and is lauded with applause.

Gayatri and Gayatri Patel then visit the jail, where Sivaji is. Gayatri reunites with him. The jailer realizes Sivaji's humanitarian nature and decides to have Gayatri Patel hanged. While Sivaji and Gayatri are leaving, Gayatri Patel attacks Sivaji, and both fight. The police are not able to distinguish between the two men. Soon, Gayatri shoots Gayatri Patel. The film ends with Sivaji and Gayatri leaving the jail.

Cast

Production
After a break of two years, Mohan Babu announced the film Gayatri, where he will be playing a dual role, the hero and the villain, produced by himself under the banner Sree Lakshmi Prasanna Pictures co-starring his son Vishnu Manchu and Shriya Saran. Actors Brahmanandam, Posani Krishna Murali, Kota Srinivasa Rao, Tanikella Bharani, and Ali were signed to play important roles with S. Thaman providing the music. The film was shot at Tirupati and Ramoji Film City. Actor Nandamuri Balakrishna, who was shooting for Jai Simha, visited Gayatri crew and wished success. Action director Kanal Kannan captured a fight sequence between Mohan Babu's that lasted for 11 days using Nero motion control rig used extensively for VFX. The first look of the film was launched on 25 December 2017 and Vishnu Manchu-Shriya Saran's first look was launched on 1 January 2018.

Soundtrack 

The music was composed by S. Thaman and released on Silly Monks Music.

Reception
Deccan Chronicle rated the film with 2.5 stars and wrote, "the film is strictly for Mohan Babu fans only and for others, the choice remain with us". Firstpost wrote that the film could have been a taut thriller, but doesn't quite hit the mark saying Gayatri is a film tailor-made for Mohan Babu. New Indian Express wrote that the "film packs a punch for the commendable performance of Mohan Babu and makes for a decent watch".

References

External links
 

2018 films
2010s action comedy-drama films
2010s Telugu-language films
Indian action comedy-drama films
Indian black comedy films
Indian remakes of foreign films